The Europe Female was an event on the 2008 Vintage Yachting Games program at the IJsselmeer, Netherlands. Six out of the seven scheduled race were completed. 10 sailors, on 10 boats, from 6 nations entered.

Venue overview

Race area and Course
Approximately 2 nautical miles of the coast of Medemblik two course areas (orange and yellow) were used for the 2008 edition of the Vintage Yachting Games.

For the 2008 edition of the Vintage Yachting Games four different courses were available. The Europe Female could only use course 1.

Wind conditions 
During the 2008 Vintage Yachting Games the sailors experienced the following weather conditions:

Races

Summary 
In the Europe Female at race area Orange only six races could be completed.

By the female participants, Svenja Puls, Germany, got a major lead of 15 points, with four wins out of six races, over her opponent Silvia Zennaro from Italy. Elisabet Llargués Masachs from Spain took the bronze.

Results 

 dnc = did not compete
 dns = did not start
 dnf = did not finish
 dsq = disqualified
 ocs = on course side
 ret = retired after finish
 Crossed out results did not count for the total result.

Daily standings

Victors

References 

 

Europe Female